Jonathan Rashleigh may refer to:

 Jonathan Rashleigh (1591–1675), English politician, for Fowey in 1614, 1621, 1625, April 1640 and November 1640, and 1661
 Jonathan Rashleigh (1642–1702), English politician, MP for Fowey 1675-81 and 1689-95
 Jonathan Rashleigh (1693–1764), English politician, MP for Fowey 1727–64
 Jonathan Rashleigh (cricketer) (1820–1905), English cricketer